Squid was a British World War II ship-mounted anti-submarine weapon. It consisted of a three-barrelled mortar which launched depth charges. It replaced the Hedgehog system, and was in turn replaced by the Limbo system.

Development 
Ordered directly from the drawing board in 1942, under the auspices of the Directorate of Miscellaneous Weapons Development, this weapon was rushed into service in May 1943 on board HMS Ambuscade. The first production unit was installed on HMS Hadleigh Castle; it went on to be installed on 70 frigates and corvettes during the Second World War. The first successful use was by HMS Loch Killin on 31 July 1944, when she sank . The system was credited with sinking 17 submarines in 50 attacks over the course of the war. By 1959, 195 Squid installations had been produced.

This weapon was a three-barrel  mortar with the mortars mounted in series but off-bore from each other in order to scatter the projectiles. The barrels were mounted in a frame that could be rotated through 90 degrees for loading. On some vessels, the Squid installations were at the stern – the bombs were fired over the length of the ship and dropping into the sea slightly ahead of it. Sink rate was 43.5 ft/s (13.3 m/s) and a clockwork time fuze was used to determine the detonation depth; all three projectiles had to be set to the same depth; this could be continuously updated right up to the moment of launch to take into account the movements of the target.

The weapons were automatically fired from the sonar range recorder at the proper moment. The pattern formed a triangle about 40 yards (37 m) on a side at a distance of 275 yards (250 m) ahead of the ship. Most Squid installations utilised two sets of mortars. All six bombs were fired in salvo so they formed opposing triangular spreads. Postwar trials found Squid was nine times more effective than conventional depth charges.

Use 
Despite its proven effectiveness, some officers, notably Captain Kenneth Adams, RCN, opposed fitting Squid to escorts because it meant sacrificing guns, which would make ships unsuitable for fleet actions.

In April 1977, the Type 61 frigate Salisbury became the last ship to fire Squid in Royal Navy service. Examples of the mortars are on display at the Explosion! Museum of Naval Firepower in Gosport, Hampshire and another at Devonport Naval Base.

In Swedish service the system soldiered on until 1982 when the Östergötland-class destroyers were decommissioned.

Gallery

Notes

References
 Citations

 Bibliography

 Jane's Naval Weapon Systems Issue 33, E R Hooton, 
 Naval Armament, Doug Richardson, 1981, Jane's Publishing,

External links

Explosive weapons
Anti-submarine mortars
Naval weapons of the United Kingdom
World War II naval weapons of the United Kingdom
World War II mortars
305 mm artillery
Weapons and ammunition introduced in 1943